Minuscule 868 (in the Gregory-Aland numbering), A701 (von Soden), is a 17th-century Greek minuscule manuscript of the New Testament on paper, with a commentary. The manuscript has no complex context.

Description 

The codex contains the text of the Gospel of Luke on 624 paper leaves (size ), with one lacuna. The text is written in one column per page, 26 lines per page. The biblical text is surrounded by a catena.

Text 
The Greek text of the codex is a representative of the Byzantine text-type. Kurt Aland the Greek text of the codex placed in Category V.
It was not examined by the Claremont Profile Method.
Robert Devreesse suggested ("Chaînes Exégétiques Grecques," Dictionnaire de la Bible, Supplément 1 (1928)) that 868 was copied from 381.

History 

F. H. A. Scrivener and C. R. Gregory dated the manuscript to the 17th century.  Currently the manuscript is dated by the INTF to the 17th century.

Probably it was rewritten from minuscule 381.

The manuscript was added to the list of New Testament manuscripts by Scrivener (683e) and Gregory (868e). Gregory saw it in 1886.

Currently the manuscript is housed at the Vatican Library (Gr. 1933), in Rome.

See also 

 List of New Testament minuscules
 Biblical manuscript
 Textual criticism
 Minuscule 867

References

Further reading

External links 
 

Greek New Testament minuscules
17th-century biblical manuscripts
Manuscripts of the Vatican Library